The Marine and Coastal Area (Takutai Moana) Act 2011 is an Act of the New Zealand Parliament created to replace the Foreshore and Seabed Act 2004. It was brought in by the fifth National government and creates a  property class for the marine and coastal area, in which it is vested in no one. This is in contrast to the Foreshore and Seabed Act 2004 in which the foreshore and seabed were vested in the Crown.

Features of the Act

The Marine and Coastal Area Act:
 Guarantees free public access.
 Makes a common space of the public marine and coastal area, ensuring it can never be sold.
 Protects all existing uses, including recreational fishing and navigation rights.
 Addresses two fundamental rights violated by the Foreshore and Seabed Act – the right to access justice through the courts, and property rights. The Act provides for primarily two types of rights: protected customary rights, and customary marine title. 
 In order to establish protected customary rights, the applicant must show that the right has been exercised since 1840, continues to be exercised in accordance with tikanga Maori, and is not extinguished by law. This is not an interest in land, but a protection of certain customary interests in that land. 
 In order to establish customary marine title, the applicant must show that the area is held in accordance with tikanga Maori and has been exclusively used and occupied since 1840 without substantial interruption. This is an interest in land, but it does not include the right of alienation or disposition.  
 Protects, and in some cases extends, rights of vital infrastructure such as ports and aquaculture.

Enactment
Māori Party Party co-leader Dame Tariana Turia, who left Labour and established the Māori Party largely as a response to the Foreshore and Seabed Act 2004, began the third reading of the Bill in the House of Representatives on 24 March 2011. In expressing the support of the Māori Party, she noted, "This bill is another step in our collective pursuit of Treaty injustice. ... This bill was never just about the Māori Party; it started with the leadership of the eight iwi who took an application to the Maori Land Court at the top of the South Island", referring to the Ngati Apa case. 

On 24 March 2011, the bill was passed at third reading by a vote of 63 to 56; it received royal assent on 31 March and came into force on April 1. It was supported by the National, the Māori Party, and United Future, while the Labour, the Greens, ACT, the Progressive Party and Hone Harawira voted against it. This Act was the key reason why Harawira left the Māori Party. In a press statement released on 23 February 2011, in which Harawira announced he was leaving the Māori Party, he stated "I did not lead the 2004 Foreshore and Seabed March from Te Rerenga Wairua to Parliament that gave birth to the Māori Party, to see it destroyed by infighting 5 years later".

Controversy

Green Party co-leader Metiria Turei opposed the legislation and argued that it represented just "how much of a failure the Maori Party-National negotiations have been over trying to resolve the inherent injustices that were put in place by New Zealand First and Labour in 2004. Those injustices remain. The failed principles are still in place in this legislation... just as they were in 2004. It is a great disappointment." The Act Party also opposed the legislation, and unsuccessfully attempted to delay the passage of the bill by lodging hundreds of questions with the Speaker.

Waitangi Tribunal
In 2020 the Waitangi Tribunal found the act breached the Treaty of Waitangi.
The tribunal found the Act failed to provide adequate and timely information about the Crown engagement pathway for applicants, and that it had breached its Treaty Duty of active protection by not funding all reasonable costs incurred by the applicant.

See also
New Zealand foreshore and seabed controversy

References

External links 

Stage One of the WAI 2660 Waitangi Tribunal Inquiry
Text of the Act
The Foreshore and Seabed ministerial review panel (with attached documents summarising the panel's conclusions on the Act). 

Māori politics
Statutes of New Zealand
2011 in New Zealand law
Aboriginal title in New Zealand